Boryszew is a Polish public company listed on the Warsaw Stock Exchange and it is on the exchange's WIG30 index of largest companies. Parts of the Boryszew group are engaged in the production of components for the automotive trade, chemical materials (including antifreeze), metals oxides, and other metal elements. It is based in Sochaczew.

The company's headquarters is in Warsaw.

History

The history of the company dates back to 1911, when a rayon production facility was established in the Boryszew area (currently a district of Sochaczew). Before World War II, the company was involved in the production of gunpowder, materials, pharmaceuticals, cosmetics, and dental cements.

Under communism, in the People's Republic of Poland, the company was involved in the production of dental materials and pharmaceuticals, coolants and brake fluids, and later also plastics.

In 1992, the company was fully privatized. Since May 1996, the company has been listed on the Warsaw Stock Exchange.

Since 2000, the company has been controlled by Roman Karkosik, a stock trader.

In 2010, the company began to expand outside of Poland, acquiring assets of Maflow group (in Italy, Poland, France, Spain, Brazil, China, India and Mexico). In 2011, it took over the German companies Theysohn, AKT and Wedo.

General income of the Boryszew group in 2012, exceeded 4,920 million złoty, and sales revenues amounted to more than 4,870 million. In 2014, a factory was opened in Russia, in 2016 in Mexico, and in 2017, in Prenzlau, Germany.

In 2019, the Alchemia S.A. Group was acquired and commencement of the steel segment.

External links
 Investor Relations for Boryszew

References 

Chemical companies of Poland
Manufacturing companies of Poland
Manufacturing companies established in 1911
1911 establishments in Poland
Companies listed on the Warsaw Stock Exchange
Auto parts suppliers of Poland
Polish brands